The Nakajima C3N-1 (also designated Type 97 Carrier Reconnaissance Aircraft) was a prototype Japanese carrier-based reconnaissance aircraft of the 1930s.  A single-engine monoplane with a fixed undercarriage, although only two examples were built, they were both used operationally, carrying out land-based reconnaissance missions during the Second Sino-Japanese War.

Development
In 1935, the Nakajima Aircraft Company submitted a design to meet an Imperial Japanese Navy Air Service requirement for a carrier based-reconnaissance aircraft.  The design, designated Type S by Nakajima, had a great deal in common with the Nakajima B5N torpedo-bomber that was being developed in parallel.  The Type S was a low-winged single-engined monoplane of all metal construction, with upward folding wings for ease of stowage aboard carriers. Unlike the B5N its undercarriage was of fixed tailwheel type with spatted main wheels.  Power was by the same Nakajima Hikari radial engine used by early B5Ns.  A crew of three were accommodated under a long canopy, with a single 7.7 mm machine gun operated by a gunner and a second fixed forward-firing gun aimed by the pilot.

The first of two prototypes was completed in October 1936.  After testing and completing carrier qualification, the type was officially adopted as the Type 97 Carrier Reconnaissance Aircraft, with the  short designation of C3N-1.  No production followed, however, as the B5N was considered adequate in the reconnaissance role.

Operational history
The two C3N-1s were sent to China for tactical evaluation in 1937, during the early months of the Second Sino-Japanese War, being used operationally for land based reconnaissance missions in the Hankou and Shanghai regions.

Specifications (C3N)

See also

Notes

References

Mikesh, Robert C. and Shorzoe Abe. Japanese Aircraft 1910-1941. London:Putnam, 1990. .

External links

Nakajima C3N

Carrier-based aircraft
C3N, Nakajima
C3N
Low-wing aircraft
Aircraft first flown in 1936